John Anthony Pitt (born 30 January 1937) is a former English first-class cricketer.

While undertaking his national service as a non-commissioned officer in the British Army, Pitt made a single appearance in first-class cricket for the Combined Services cricket team against Warwickshire at Birmingham in 1957. Batting twice in the match, Pitt scored 10 runs in the Combined Services first-innings before being dismissed by Michael Youll, while in their second-innings he remained unbeaten with 26 runs. He also bowled three overs with his right-arm medium pace in Warwickshire's first-innings, without taking a wicket.

References

External links

1939 births
Living people
Cricketers from Dewsbury
English cricketers
Combined Services cricketers